WEBQ (1240 AM) is a radio station broadcasting a country music format. Licensed to Harrisburg, Illinois, the station serves Southern Illinois.

History
WEBQ's first license was granted on September 30, 1924, to the Tate Radio Company in Harrisburg, Illinois. The call letters were randomly assigned from a sequential roster of available call signs. It made its debut broadcast on the evening of November 26, 1924.

References

External links
WEBQ's website

FCC History Cards for WEBQ (covering 1927-1981)

EBQ
Radio stations established in 1924
1924 establishments in Illinois
Country radio stations in the United States